Best of Ziana Zain is a greatest hits album by Ziana Zain that was released on 1998.

Track listing
 "Puncak Kasih" (Adnan Abu Hassan, Maya Sari) — 5:29
 "Putus Terpaksa" (Saari Amri) — 5:10
 "Anggapan Mu" (Asmin Mudin) — 4:43
 "Madah Berhelah" (Saari Amri) — 4:48
 "Satu Detik" (Azlan Abu Hassan, Maya Sari) — 3:37
 "Kalau Mencari Teman" (Razman, Habsah Hassan) — 4:20
 "Kemelut Di Muara Kasih" (Saari Amri, Lukhman S.) — 5:13
 "Terlerai Kasih" (Johari Teh) — 4:14
 "Setia Ku Di Sini"  (Salman, Nurbisa II) — 5:09
 "Kekal" (Saari Amri) — 4:10
 "Korban Cinta" (Johari Teh) — 5:09
 "Tiada Kepastian" (Johari Teh) — 3:43
 "Bersama Akhirnya" (Johari Teh) — 4:56
 "Tiada Jodoh Antara Kita" (Bonus Track) (Fauzi Marzuki, Lukhman S.) — 4:45

Charts

References

External links
 Fan Site

1998 greatest hits albums
Malay-language compilation albums
Bertelsmann Music Group compilation albums
Ziana Zain compilation albums